Onagrodes victoria is a moth in the family Geometridae. It is found in southern Myanmar (the Tanintharyi Region) and on Borneo.

References

Moths described in 1958
Eupitheciini